Derek W. Armstrong (born August 17, 1980) is an American Republican politician and a former member of the Nevada Assembly representing District 21. He won the 2014 Republican primary against Andrew Coates. Armstrong defeated incumbent Andy Eisen. He lost reelection in 2016.

Armstrong is a lawyer and veteran of the United States Marine Corps.

References

External links
Campaign website
Campaign Facebook page
 

Nevada Republicans
People from the Las Vegas Valley
1980 births
Living people
University of Nevada, Las Vegas alumni
21st-century American politicians